{{DISPLAYTITLE:CH6N2}}
The molecular formula CH6N2 (molar mass: 46.07 g/mol, exact mass: 46.0531 u) may refer to:

 Methanediamine
 Monomethylhydrazine (mono-methyl hydrazine, MMH)